El Dorado Speedway is a motorsports venue in Juan Aldama, Chihuahua near the state capital of Chihuahua City. Currently El Dorado Speedway hosts dates for the NASCAR PEAK Mexico Series since 2012.

About
Construction on El Dorado Speedway began in 2011 and was completed in 2012. The main layout of the speedway is a 1 km (.625 mi.) D-shaped concrete oval. The track also features a smaller oval and an infield road course, or a "roval".

References

External links
 Official site
 El Dorado Speedway - NASCAR Home Tracks
 El Dorado Speedway race results at Racing-Reference

NASCAR tracks
Motorsport venues in Mexico
Sports venues in Chihuahua (state)